John Moors Cabot (December 11, 1901 – February 24, 1981) was an American diplomat and U.S. Ambassador to five nations during the Truman, Eisenhower, and Kennedy administrations. He also served as Assistant Secretary of State for Inter-American Affairs. He warned repeatedly of the dangers of Soviet communism toward American interests in Latin America.

Early life
Cabot was born in Cambridge, Massachusetts.  His father was Godfrey Lowell Cabot (1861–1962), founder of Cabot Corporation and a philanthropist. His mother was Maria Moors Cabot. Two of his siblings were Thomas Dudley Cabot (b. 1897), businessman and philanthropist, and Eleanor Cabot of the Eleanor Cabot Bradley Estate.

Cabot graduated from Buckingham Browne & Nichols in 1919. He would go on to graduate magna cum laude from Harvard University in 1923, and from Oxford University with a degree in Modern History.

Career
Cabot joined the US Foreign Service in 1926. Much of his early career was spent in Latin America.  His first Foreign Service assignment was as a consul in Callao-Lima, Peru, in 1927. For the next eight years, he served in the Dominican Republic, Mexico and Brazil. From 1935 to 1939, he served first in the Netherlands and then in Sweden. From 1939 to 1941, he was in Guatemala.

During much of World War II, Cabot worked in the State Department as assistant chief of the division of American Republics and then as chief of the division of Caribbean and Central American affairs. 

He was posted to Argentina after the war and, then, in 1947, he was appointed counsellor of the US Embassy in Belgrade, Yugoslavia.  He was then appointed US Consul General in Shanghai between 1948 and 1949 and was in post when the Communist troops took over the city in May, 1949.

Cabot served a U.S. Ambassador to Sweden from 1954 to 1957, Colombia from 1957 to 1959, Brazil from 1959 to 1961, and Poland from 1962 to 1965, during the Eisenhower and Kennedy administration. He was also commissioned to Pakistan during a recess of the Senate, but did not serve under this appointment. From 1953 to 1954, he also served as Assistant Secretary of State for Inter-American Affairs. There is a 27 page transcript from an interview of Cabot, discussing the Alliance for Progress, Bay of Pigs invasion, Cold War, foreign policy, and international relations during the Kennedy administration, archived in the John F. Kennedy Presidential Library and Museum.

As ambassador to Brazil, 1959-61 his public relations campaigns on behalf of American business angered nationalist politicians and journalists. President Jânio Quadros of Brazil publicly rebuked Cabot for questioning Brazil's foreign policy and tolerance of the Cuban revolution. President John Kennedy recalled Cabot early in 1961.
 
In December 1954, Cabot, in his role as U.S. ambassador to Sweden, attended the Nobel banquet and read the acceptance speech for the Nobel Prize in Literature awarded that year to Ernest Hemingway who was not present due to ill health.

Following his retirement from the U.S. Department of State, he taught at Georgetown University's Edmund A. Walsh School of Foreign Service and Tufts Fletcher School of Law and Diplomacy. In 1981, Tuft's John M. and Elizabeth L. Cabot Intercultural Center was named in honor of Cabot and his wife.

Personal life
In 1932, he married Vassar College graduate Elizabeth Lewis (d. 1992). Together, they were the parents of four children:
 John G.L. Cabot (b. 1934)
 Lewis P. Cabot (d. 2020), owner of the Portland, Maine-based Southworth Machine Company
 Marjorie Cabot, who married Antonio Enríquez Savignac (1931–2007) in 1957.
 Elizabeth T. Cabot, who married Bogislav von Wentzel.

Cabot died at Georgetown University Hospital in Washington, D.C. on February 24, 1981.

Published works
 The Racial Conflict in Transylvania: A Discussion of the Conflicting Claims of Rumania and Hungary to Transylvania, the Banat, and the Eastern Section of the Hungarian Plain, 1926
 Toward Our Common American Destiny: Speeches and Interviews on Latin American Problems, 1954
 First line of defense: forty years' experiences of a career diplomat (Georgetown University, School of Foreign Service, 1979).

References

Further reading
 Streeter, Stephen M. "Campaigning against Latin American Nationalism: US Ambassador John Moors Cabot in Brazil, 1959-1961." The Americas 51.2 (1994): 193-218.

External links
 John Moors Cabot at U.S. Department of State

1901 births
1981 deaths
Alumni of Brasenose College, Oxford
Ambassadors of the United States to Brazil
Ambassadors of the United States to Colombia
Ambassadors of the United States to Finland
Ambassadors of the United States to Poland
Ambassadors of the United States to Sweden
Buckingham Browne & Nichols School alumni
Cabot family
Consuls general of the United States in Shanghai
Harvard University alumni
People from Cambridge, Massachusetts
The Fletcher School at Tufts University faculty
United States Foreign Service personnel
Walsh School of Foreign Service faculty